Power Rangers S.P.D. is the 2005 season of Power Rangers that tells the story of the fight between the Power Rangers of the Space Patrol Delta police force and the Troobian Empire in the year 2025.

S.P.D. Rangers
The S.P.D. (or SPD) Power Rangers are characters and heroes in the Power Rangers universe, and the primary protagonists in the television series Power Rangers S.P.D.. This series is set in the year 2025.

The S.P.D. Rangers that appear in the series are labeled B-Squad, a weak team that are initially a backup team as their name suggests. They are promoted to the Earth's primary line of defense and granted Ranger status after the A-Squad vanishes, as well acting as tutors for the D-Squad Cadets. They are an integral part of the Space Patrol Delta organization.

Jack Landors
Jack Landors (played by Brandon Jay McLaren) is the S.P.D. Red Ranger. Once a homeless street thief alongside his best friend Z, Jack volunteered to become the Red B-Squad Ranger in order to save Z's life as well as those of the other Rangers and took over as team leader, to the ire of Sky Tate. At first, he took his position as team leader very lightly, but has since proven he is a very capable and effective  leader, albeit one who often clashes with the chain of command as well as bend the rules sometimes (giving Sky a head start to deal with a former partner by "reciting" a regulation when he's not allowed to pursue on his own). He formed a slightly uneasy but respect-based relationship with Sky, taking tactical suggestions from him in the field and helping him deal with his issues regarding Mirloc and his father.

After his encounter with the volunteer Ally, he realized that, while he liked being a Ranger, what he really wanted to do was go back to helping people on the streets - the conflict of these two interests led to him nearly botching the mission against Delex. Following the destruction of the Magnificence and the containment of Gruumm, Jack left S.P.D. to work with Ally full-time and Sky took his place. Despite his casual attitude, he loathes having to say goodbye and left S.P.D. without telling the rest of B-Squad; despite this, they remain close.

It is possible that he rejoined his teammates during Power Rangers Super Megaforce, as all five B-Squad Ranger powers were employed during the final battle with the Armada.

While unmorphed, his genetic power enables him to become intangible and pass through any object. As the Red Ranger, he has exclusive access to a Battlizer and also control over two separate Zords and S.W.A.T. Mode. He wields the Delta Blasters and is an impressive sharpshooter. His uniform sports the number 1.

Jack doesn't know when he was born. Syd, however, offered to share her birthday with him.

Schuyler "Sky" Tate
Schuyler "Sky" Tate (played by Chris Violette) is the S.P.D. Blue Ranger and second-in-command who was originally a stickler for rules. Sky is top on B-Squad on weapons and fighting, and believes he should be the Red Ranger just like his father was. Unfortunately, his pride, and lack of faith in his friends/ teammates, citing such reasons as Syd is a girl, causing him to fail a test of character, and as a result Commander Cruger picks him to be the Blue Ranger.

When Sky faces off against Mirloc, the one responsible for the death of his father, Jack thinks Sky should be the one to bring him in as the Red Ranger. Although it was an honor to be the Red Ranger, Sky realized that heroes come in all colors. After going through extensive S.W.A.T. training on Zantor to acquire S.W.A.T. Mode, he discovers the importance of his team. With teamwork, they are able to even defeat the corrupt A-Squad. Over time, he learns the values of following rather than leading, and when put in a temporary leading position, impresses even Cruger with the skills he learned during their battles.

With Jack leaving S.P.D., Sky has grown into a great leader and has learned to accept his teammates as equals. Cruger chooses him to step up as the new Red Ranger. When Cruger becomes Supreme Commander, Sky replaces Cruger and is promoted to Earth Commander and Bridge replaced Sky as the S.P.D. Red Ranger.

He may have reassumed his Blue Ranger powers to join the Ranger army in Super Megaforce.

While unmorphed, his genetic power allows him to create force fields.

Bridge Carson
Bridge Carson (played by Matt Austin) is the S.P.D. Green Ranger. Bridge might appear slow at times, but he is a computer genius, a master mechanic, and much more. He might be gullible, but he also has a heart of gold. People underestimate Bridge, but he always manages to come through with his quick-thinking. He is well known for his love of "buttery" toast, and one of his more amusing behaviors is an apparent inability to say the word "buttery" without wiggling his fingers in front of his mouth. The phrase "buttery" was first mentioned by him when offering toast to the Yellow S.P.D. Ranger, Z, who formed a firm friendship with him; as evidenced when she defended him, when Sky blamed Syd's confusion and Bridge's ramblings. While thinking, he will sometimes do a handstand to help him think, or so he says. He is also Jewish since in "Walls" he tells Jack that he celebrates Hanukkah when Jack says that Christmas has come early upon Bridge and him receiving new patrol bikes.

Bridge takes it upon himself to over-analyze any situation and sometimes lacks confidence. Bridge endures S.W.A.T. training on Zantor with the others to achieve S.W.A.T. Mode. Bridge relies more on intuition than any other Ranger and is the first one to sense that something is wrong with A-Squad. As time goes on, the other Rangers come to respect how he always comes through for them and he becomes more confident.

While unmorphed, his genetic power gives him a form of psychometry and the ability to scan and read auras and energy signatures. He has no control over this ability, and consequently wears gloves most of the time. As the series progressed, Bridge's power evolved to include tracking thoughts, since, as he stated, thoughts are energy.

After Jack left S.P.D., and once Sky was promoted to Red Ranger, Bridge was promoted to Blue Ranger. After Commander Cruger is promoted, Sky is promoted as well, leaving Bridge as the Red Ranger. He was later called upon to join veteran Rangers Adam Park, Tori Hanson, Kira Ford, and Xander Bly in battling alongside the Operation Overdrive Rangers against the villainous alliance led by Thrax.

He may also have become the Green Ranger again with his predecessors reclaiming their Red and Blue powers for the final battle with the Armada in Super Megaforce.

His assigned S.P.D. number is 3; he is later promoted to 2 and eventually to 1.

Elizabeth "Z" Delgado
Elizabeth "Z" Delgado (played by Monica May) is the S.P.D. Yellow Ranger. When Z was younger, she was considered an outcast at school due to her genetic power. She ran away and upon being attacked by a vicious monster, she was saved by a disguised Anubis Cruger. Eventually, she began living on the streets. It was there that she met her best friend Jack and began stealing. She eventually grew tired of that profession and wished to be part of something bigger, which led to her being drafted into the S.P.D. B-Squad.

Despite their differing personalities, she formed a firm friendship with both Bridge and Syd, often teaming up with the Pink Ranger in battle. She defended her when Sky blamed Syd's confusion and Bridge's ramblings. Easy-going and somewhat sloppy, she is a viciously determined fighter and, due to her past alienation, took it upon herself to reach out to young Sam.

Her genetic power of duplication allows her to become a virtual one-Ranger army in the blink of an eye. Z has the power to make several copies of herself when needed.

She has a long history with Piggy and appears to trust him as a friend, often going to him for underworld information or help even when his duplicitous nature was obvious. When he was revealed to be openly working for Gruumm, Z was shocked that he could have betrayed them.

Through S.W.A.T. training on Zantor, Z learns to get over her differences with Syd and together as a team, the Rangers take down a corrupted A-Squad. When Jack leaves S.P.D., Z stays with the Rangers and continues to live out her dream of protecting the innocent.

She and her teammates later appeared as part of the Ranger army in Super Megaforce.

Her assigned S.P.D. number is 4, and she is never shown to have been promoted after Sky becomes Red. She is good at tap dancing and jazz dancing.

Sydney "Syd" Drew
Sydney "Syd" Drew (played by Alycia Purrott) is the S.P.D. Pink Ranger. Her parents worked at S.P.D. and were involved with the creation of the Delta Morphers, which altered Syd's DNA, giving her her genetic ability. Her family is very wealthy. She was on the B-Squad along with Sky Tate and Bridge Carson.

Her life before S.P.D. is not clear. Multiple references during the show imply that she has many talents, including being an excellent fencer, pop star, and model. Despite her flagrant vanity and occasional selfishness, she is very caring and compassionate, and is often the first to stand up for someone when they are being treated wrong. Though she and Z are constantly fighting, deep down they care for each other and very frequently team up in battle.

When unmorphed, her genetic ability allows her to change her hand into any material she needs.

Syd and her teammates later took part in the Megaforce Rangers' final battle with the Armada.

Sam
Sam (played by Aaron James Murphy as young Sam, voiced by Brett Stewart as the Omega Ranger, and voiced by Yuri Lowenthal in the Power Rangers: Super Legends video game) was once a very lonely and misunderstood street orphan whose mother died in a tragic incident and whose genetic powers (of being able to teleport objects) made him a constant target for bullies. His desperate search for friends led him to be manipulated by Mora and her newest creation Bugglesworth, who turned people into dolls for Mora to collect. While the other Rangers were quick to judge Sam poorly, Z realized that Sam was not evil and just wanted to fit in. Although it took a lot of convincing, Sam eventually agreed to stay with his new friend and the other Rangers at the S.P.D. Academy.

In the year 2040, Sam was chosen by S.P.D. to become the Omega Ranger and charged with a special mission: travelling back through time to 2025 to stop the rogue Morgana from destroying the Rangers and eventually Earth, thus preventing the disaster that has befallen his world. He destroyed Shorty upon the start of the deciding battle and drove off Morgana and Devastation however he refused help believing the Rangers of this time too outdated to help him. He later learned he was wrong when the other Rangers rushed to his aid when he was in trouble and together they saved the future by riding the Delta Squad Megazord on the back of the Omegamax Cycle and blasting Devastation's robot until it was destroyed and then capturing him. This battle taught him the value of teamwork. However, passing through the time warp heavily altered his human form, reducing him to a floating orb of pure energy. Due to this setback, his only remotely human form is his Ranger form. As Kat searched for a way to send him back to the future, he assisted the B-Squad Rangers in their battle to save Earth.

Omega joined the B-Squad to prevent Emperor Gruumm's invasion and brought with him a powerful array of futuristic equipment including the Uniforce Cycle, a Zord known as the Omegamax Cycle, and an Omega Morpher that - in addition to increasing his strength (Muscle Mode), allowed him to perform various feats including temporal manipulation (Hyper Mode), fire bursts of electricity from his palm (Electro Mode), and an ultimate finisher attack of shining energy (Lightbeam Mode). Like the S.P.D. and Patrol morphers, the Omega Morpher can also grant access to the Judgement Mode function. His suit brandishes the Roman Numeral for six, "VI".

When some friends of Piggy stole the S.W.A.T. technology, Sam's technological advancements were outmatched, but, as he is "the force from the future", he was always at the Rangers disposal when they needed him.

During the final battle against Gruumm, Sam's old friend Nova Ranger came looking for him. After the battle ended, the two of them returned to the future. Presumably she was able to return him to human form as he unmorphed for a moment before traveling back to the future.

He apparently joined his teammates in traveling to the past in Super Megaforce to battle the Warstar Armada alongside other past Rangers.

Anubis "Doggie" Cruger
Anubis "Doggie" Cruger is a member of the dog-like Sirian race from the planet Sirius, and was a member of the original Space Patrol Delta, training in the Academy alongside future criminal Icthior. He led the SPD forces against the Troobian Empire's invasion, fighting and scarring Emperor Gruumm by shearing off his right horn, before General Benagg kidnapped his wife Isinia and managed to bring down Cruger from behind. The battle was lost and all the Sirians except for Cruger and Isinia were killed. After that, Anubis made a vow to never fight again and left for Earth, thinking his wife was lost.

On Earth, Anubis founded the S.P.D. Earth Academy and trained the elite S.P.D. Ranger squads. He sends the A-Squad Rangers to the Helix Nebula to fight at the front line against Grumm, not realising this was a trap by Gruumm to take out Earth's front line of defense. When he hears that Gruumm is on his way to Earth and could not contact the A-Squad, he promotes the B-Squad Rangers to active status and gives Schyler "Sky" Tate, Bridge Carson, and Sydney "Syd" Drew a set of S.P.D. Morphers. They were soon joined by Elizabeth "Z" Delgado and Jack Landors.

Cruger is portrayed as a good judge of character. He gives both Jack Landors and Elizabeth Delgado, two criminals, a chance at redemption by making them Rangers, and sees the potential in Boom when he drops out of the Academy.

Anubis will go to any lengths to protect those he values and loves; for example, when Dr. Manx was abducted by General Benaag, he broke his own vow of peace and became the Shadow Ranger (suit number 100). He is armed with his Patrol Morpher (his morphing call of "S.P.D. Emergency!" is the same as the other S.P.D. Rangers, but his morpher is different, as the normally white SPD text is black), the Shadow Saber, and the Delta Command Megazord (in reality, the S.P.D. Base). As the Shadow Ranger, he has proved to be a great asset to the B-Squad Rangers. He takes a very hardline approach to discipline and training, once deliberately letting the Rangers see he was watching them being defeated and not intervening in order to make them stop relying on Shadow Ranger to solve their battles for them. Sometimes he can go too far, at which point Kat will argue against him.

Cruger is not fond of his superior officer, Supreme Commander Fowler Birdy. He demonstrates this in his referring to Birdy as "that overstuffed pelican". The two do not have similar strategic styles, and this temporarily resulted in Cruger being dismissed and relieved of command duty. However, Birdy changed his tune forever when the Shadow Ranger showed up to save him from Gruumm. Cruger did possess a high level of respect for previous Power Rangers, expressing particular pleasure at working with Tommy Oliver when their two teams worked together against a time-traveling Gruumm and Zeltrax. Cruger erased the memories of most of the Dino Rangers to prevent contamination of history, but- after agreeing with his Rangers that it wasn't fair that only the Dino Rangers should forget their encounter- he then erased B-Squad's memories and his own before they returned to the future.

Although he believed that his wife was dead since the Battle of Sirius, an encounter with his old enemy General Benaag cast doubt on that belief. When Cruger used his Morpher/judgement scanner for abducting his wife, the morpher "acquitted" Benaag. Later, when his old rival-turned enemy Icthior claimed that Isinia Cruger was still alive, Cruger wasn't sure what to believe. He never told the B-Squad about his marriage to Isinia or about her in general— keeping his painful secret from everyone but Kat.

The question was answered after he was taken captive by A-Squad. He saw her being held captive onboard Gruumm's spacecraft. Also when the A-Squad returned he started to ignore B-Squad and they thought that he was just demoting them on purpose and was going to ignore them again although he presumably did this because of procedure. Dr. Kat Manx admitted to the B-Squad when they went to fight the A-Squad that he told her that they were the best squad that he ever had the pleasure of working with showing them just how highly he really thought of them.

After B-Squad was thrown into captivity along with Cruger, they all escaped with Piggy's help. B-Squad returned to Earth while Cruger morphed and engaged Gruumm in battle card-capturing Mora along the way. Cruger came out the winner and rescued Isinia while Grumm apparently fell to his death, but he had one more task to complete. Cruger was tasked with opening an access panel in the left arm of the Magnificence, which would allow the S.W.A.T. Megazord to destroy it with a maxed-out laser blast. He did, and the Megazord fired, causing the Magnificence to implode, destroying Omni and saving Earth and the universe. Cruger was thought dead, but he and Isinia survived. This discovery overjoyed the Rangers.

Gruumm survived as well, and engaged Cruger (who was unmorphed) one last time, only to lose his left horn and be contained. Following the battle, he promoted B-Squad to A-level, only to have them refuse because ultimately, they were the B Squad, the team that had come through their trials together. Cruger made Squad B be the highest Ranger level at S.P.D. on the spot, saying then that there would be no A-Squad. He also promoted Sky to Red Ranger status, and Bridge to Blue Ranger status following the departure of Jack. There was no mention of a new Green S.P.D. Ranger.

In the first half of the two-part Operation Overdrive episode "Once a Ranger", it is revealed that an unknown amount of time after the finale of S.P.D., Cruger is promoted to Supreme Commander when Fowler Birdy retires, bringing about the subsequent promotions of Sky Tate to Commander of S.P.D. Earth, and Bridge Carson to B-Squad's leader as the Red Ranger. It is unknown if he kept his Shadow Ranger powers, or if he passed them down to Sky when Sky was promoted to his old position.

The Shadow Ranger was also not among the veteran Rangers who appeared in Super Megaforce.

Cruger is performed by John Tui (who later portrayed as Daggeron in Power Rangers Mystic Force), and voiced by Darryl Kurylo in the Power Rangers: Super Legends video game and Kyle Hebert in Battle for the Grid.

Dr. Katherine "Kat" Manx
Dr. Katherine "Kat" Manx (played by Michelle Langstone) is the technical expert for Earth's S.P.D.(Space Patrol Delta), a master of many sciences, and the S.P.D. Kat Ranger. She is a humanoid cat-like alien of an unknown world. Despite her youthful appearance, Kat is 147 Earth years old. Kat serves as the chief technologist in S.P.D. and was responsible for the invention of all of Earth's S.P.D. technology, from the Judgment Scanner to the Delta Command Megazord. During all S.P.D. missions, she can be found in the Command Center running ops and providing scientific assistance to the Rangers.

Kat was part of the early days of Earth's SPD branch, when it was a top-secret organisation in 2001, the same year that the Time Force season was set during. She was one of several scientists, along with the B-Squad's parents, who worked with highly energized chemicals that led to the B-Squad's mutations. Kat is also a good friend to Commander Cruger, though she considers him a "stubborn old dog", and provides a reasoned argument against his more emotional decision. When General Benaag captured her, Cruger accepted the Patrol Morpher that she had given him and became the Shadow Ranger (Producer Greg Aronowitz has stated in a podcast interview that Kat was in love with Cruger and vice versa, but that he never acted on it; the comment comes 16 minutes into the interview).

Kat serves as a mentor to Boom, a reject from the academy. Despite his apparent ineptitude, her teaching turned him into a technical expert.

Although Kat is a scientist by trade, she is capable of fighting when called upon. Her cat-like physiology makes her exceptionally agile, and she is a skilled fighter. She led the defense of the Space Patrol Delta Base against the final Troobian invasion.

In "Katastrophe", Kat was granted the use of her own (temporary) Delta Morpher (given to her by Commander Birdy) to become the S.P.D. Kat Ranger. The Kat Ranger costume is half-orange and half-white with cat-like ears, making her the first 8th Ranger, and the first Ranger to share the same first name with a previous Ranger, Katherine Hillard. The Kat Ranger also marks the first time that a Power Rangers team has had three female rangers on one team. Her powers expired after an hour. Her costume was similar to those of the B-Squad, but she did not have a number on her Ranger form like the other members of S.P.D. Instead, she had a heptagon as her chest symbol.

As Kat Ranger, she created blinding auroras and threw feather-like "Cat Stunners". She wanted desperately to help out against an enemy called Mooney who was a former classmate of hers and was given the Morpher to fight. She captures Mooney herself after stopping his giant robot. In Endings Part 1 she was amongst those captured by Broodwing's forces and was put into a cell alongside Boom.

After Boom gets them out by summoning RIC she disables the Delta Command Megazord stopping Broodwing and allowing the B-Squad to capture him. In Endings Part 2 she fights in the final battle with Grumm's forces and retreats inside when the Nova Ranger shows up. She also witnesses the final showdown between Grumm and Cruger.

Nova Ranger
Nova Ranger is a fictional character in the TV series Power Rangers S.P.D. She is voiced by Antonia Prebble while her human form was portrayed by an uncredited actress. Her numeric S.P.D. insignia is the Roman Numeral for 1,000 which is the letter "M".

During the final battle with Gruumm, the B-Squad Rangers had left the S.P.D. base relatively unguarded, save for Dr. Kat Manx, Boom, the Omega Ranger, and the S.P.D. cadets. Grumm's forces were overpowering the S.P.D. forces, when a time-portal suddenly appeared, and a silver-colored Ranger stepped out. She identified herself as the S.P.D. Nova Ranger. Nova had been Sam's partner and ally in the future and possibly love interest, and had been searching various timelines in her effort to locate him. With her help, the S.P.D. base was protected from harm. A second time portal was opened after the battle ended and the unmorphed Nova Ranger, along with the unmorphed and now-fully-human Omega Ranger, returned to the future.

Nova Ranger had a blue-and-gold device identical in appearance to the Omega Ranger's Morpher, except for the colour scheme,  which was called the Nova Morpher. Like the Omega Morpher, Nova Ranger's morpher acted as her only weapon in combat and had an Electro-Mode. However, unlike the Omega Morpher, the Nova Morpher appeared to have better time traveling capabilities and the power to restore Omega Ranger to human form.

It's possible that Nova could be Dino Furys Tarrick and Santaura's younger daughter and Amelia Jones' younger sister.

Zords
Delta Runners
Delta Runners are five zords that are dispatched from the Delta Base. Originally piloted by A-Squad and then later by B-Squad.
 Delta Runner 1: Jack Landors' six-wheeled police car - able to use its Transformation Delta to manipulate objects. By combining with the Delta Sword, the Delta Runner 1 uses to destroy a giant monster or robot. It later appeared in Power Rangers Super Megaforce as part of the Legendary Zords to further support the Super Megaforce Rangers in their later battles.
 Delta Runner 2: Sky Tate's gyrocopter, armed with the laser barrels and Shrink Cuffs. Has a Rescue Cable used carry large objects.
 Delta Runner 3: Bridge Carson's armored trailer - carries the blade of the Delta Sword and the Delta Blaster into battle.
 Delta Runner 4: Elizabeth Delgado's armored car - armed with flood lights that blinds its target (Hi-Beams) and becomes the handle of the Delta Sword.
 Delta Runner 5: Sydney Drew's sign car - equipped with a large retractable signboard used to redirect traffic and warn civilians, as well as serves as a giant-sized version of the Judgement Scanner when Judgement Mode is activated.

S.W.A.T. Flyers
S.W.A.T. Flyers are five zords that are designed to be used with the S.P.D Rangers' S.W.A.T. Mode.
 S.W.A.T. Flyer 1: Piloted by Jack Landors. Is the fastest flyer of the five S.W.A.T. Flyers, and has also high mobility.
 S.W.A.T. Flyer 2: Piloted by Sky Tate. Has high stability, able to do a hovering flight. Equipped with wingtip blasters.
 S.W.A.T. Flyer 3: Piloted by Bridge Carson. Has high confidentiality, is suitable for conveyance of dangerous goods. Carries the container and accumulates the energy of S.W.A.T. Flyer Cannon in it.
 S.W.A.T. Flyer 4: Piloted by Elizabeth Delgado. Able to do a stealth flight and has the strongest body of the five S.W.A.T. Flyers. Equipped with special arms, like flares or tear-gas bombs.
 S.W.A.T. Flyer 5: Piloted by Sydney Drew. Equipped with a huge speaker, able to emit warning to enemies or tell citizens refuge advice. The fire-extinguishing activities by water-drainage are also possible.

Megazords
 Delta Squad Megazord: Delta Runners can combine to form Delta Squad Megazord, which stands 45 meters tall, weighs in at 4600 tons and power of 15,000,000 hp (11 GW). It carries the Delta Sword (which performs the Delta Power Strike finisher), the giant Shrink Cuffs handcuffs and the Delta Blaster (has normal gun). Its finisher is where it can use its Delta Blaster attack full power for its Firing Energy attack. Unfortunately, it was destroyed by A-Squad's Megazord near the finale. The Delta Runner 1 becomes Delta Squad Megazord's head, main torso, upper legs. The Delta Runner 2 becomes Delta Squad Megazord's lower left leg. The Delta Runner 3 becomes Delta Squad Megazord's lower right leg. The Delta Runner 4 becomes Delta Squad Megazord's right arm. The Delta Runner 5 becomes Delta Squad Megazord's left arm.
 Delta Base/Delta Command Crawler/Delta Command Megazord: The primary headquarters for the Earth's S.P.D. Academy, and base of operations for Anubis "Doggie" Cruger. In base mode, it can attack with its an electrical blast. But it can transform into a rover vehicle, Delta Command Crawler, for mobility (the top half of the base becomes the front half of the rover, and Photon Beams cannons come out of the back half) and the Delta Command Megazord, (the back half of the rover becomes the legs, with the Photon Beams as the knees, the front tread wells become the arms, with the back half's side lights as its hands, the dog head becomes the breast, and the front windows become the back, revealing the head), which is twice the size of its Megazords. It was hijacked in the finale by Broodwing, but its power system was disabled by Kat Manx after Boom whistled for R.I.C. to free them.
 Omegamax Cycle/Omegamax Megazord: A giant motorcycle piloted by Sam, it can become Omegamax Megazord, which possesses a powerful blades or its Omegamax Spin-Out Attack finisher.It can be ridden on by Delta Squad Megazord, known as Delta Squad Megazord Rider, where it can use the Delta Squad Megazord's Delta Blaster for its attack and through this formation it can combine with the Delta Squad Megazord to form Delta Max Megazord.
 Delta Max Megazord: When Delta Squad Megazord combines with Omegamax Cycle through the Delta Squad Megazord Rider formation, it can create Delta Max Megazord. The Delta Runner 1 becomes Delta Max Megazord's head and main torso. The Delta Runner 2 becomes Delta Max Megazord's left arm. The Delta Runner 3 becomes Delta Max Megazord's right arm. The Delta Runner 4 goes on top of Delta Max Megazord's right shoulder. The Delta Runner 5 goes on top of Delta Max Megazord's left shoulder. Omegamax Megazord becomes Delta Max Megazord's helmet, chest armor, back, shoulders, fists and lower legs. It can use its jet engines to maneuver at superhuman speeds and it can perform its finisher Full Power punching attack where it strikes with a barrage of high speed punches, and Hyperspeed Mode, a powerful uppercut punch.
 S.W.A.T. Megazord/S.W.A.T. Flyer Cannon: S.W.A.T. Flyers can combine into S.W.A.T. Megazord. Designed to be used with the S.P.D. Rangers' S.W.A.T. Mode. Armed with its dual magnum blasters and can transform into the S.W.A.T. Flyer Cannon to delete its opponent with the powerful energy blast finisher. S.W.A.T. Flyer 1 forms S.W.A.T. Megazord's head, torso, and upper legs. S.W.A.T. Flyer 2 forms S.W.A.T. Megazord's arms and S.W.A.T. Flyer Cannon's handle. S.W.A.T. Flyer 3 forms S.W.A.T. Megazord's lower legs and S.W.A.T. Flyer Cannon's barrels. S.W.A.T. Flyer 4 forms S.W.A.T. Megazord's right foot and S.W.A.T. Flyer Cannon's right muzzle. S.W.A.T. Flyer 5 forms S.W.A.T. Megazord's left foot and S.W.A.T. Flyer Cannon's left muzzle.

Allies of the Power Rangers
S.P.D.
Short for Space Patrol Delta, S.P.D. is an interplanetary police force that oversees law in the different areas of outer space. S.P.D. maintains the peace where they train and deploy their own teams of Power Rangers, who are equipped with the latest technology.

Supreme Commander Fowler Birdy
Fowler Birdy (portrayed by Paul Norell) is the bird-like Supreme Commander of S.P.D. and Commander Cruger's superior. However, the two do not get along at all, as indicated by Cruger referring to Birdy as an "over-stuffed pelican." Arrogant and supremely blunt, he does not tolerate insubordination and views Gruumm's victory on Sirius as an embarrassment.

When Birdy came to Earth to inspect S.P.D.'s Earth headquarters, his style of tactics clashed with Cruger's (which was to keep the Rangers as a team because that's how he thought they worked best). This led to Cruger's brief expulsion from S.P.D., during which Birdy took command of the Delta Base. After foolishly splitting up the Ranger team, he went out personally to fight Emperor Gruumm and was quickly overwhelmed by Gruumm's superior skill. Luckily, Shadow Ranger, acting against orders, showed up on his ATV and drove Gruumm off. Fowler was at first enraged, but changed his tune after Cruger drew a salute from his fellow Rangers. Birdy departed, commending Cruger for his actions and telling him that the galaxy is depending on him.

Birdy appeared again when Morgana launched her all out attack on the Power Rangers. Birdy told them that Galactic Command is now aware of their plight and that they couldn't respond on such short notice. Birdy told them that even if they did, they'd fear that they might fall into Gruumm's trap. Birdy concludes that they were on their own for this one and wishes them good luck.

He later appeared to promote Dr. Manx (which she later refused) to a position at Galaxy Command, and when she wanted to stop Mooney, he gave her the Kat Morpher to go into battle herself.

In the final S.P.D. episode Endings Pt. 2, Fowler Birdy, Sergeant Silverback, and some unnamed S.P.D. officials (consisting of an unnamed lion-like alien, an unnamed octopus-headed alien, an unnamed red ape-like alien, and an unnamed exotic bird-like alien) were among the S.P.D. reinforcements to assist in the final battle against the Troobians, apparently having decided to go into battle himself.

In the Operation Overdrive team-up story Once a Ranger, Bridge reveals that at some point after the finale of S.P.D., Birdy retired from his position (and moved to Miami). Cruger was promoted to his position as Supreme Commander, so Sky then was promoted as the Shadow Ranger and as the Commander of S.P.D. Earth, and Bridge was promoted as the Red S.P.D. Ranger.

Sergeant Silverback
Sergeant Silverback (performed by John Tui) is an S.P.D. training instructor based on the planet Zentor who looks like an alien gorilla. He is a (rather odd) friend of Anubis Cruger, who sends B-Squad to him following their lack of teamwork. Silverback put them through their paces, training them and strengthening the bonds of friendship between them. After receiving his approval, he sent a communication to Cruger only to learn that he was in trouble. Dismissing B-Squad once and for all from Zentor, he gave them the S.P.D. S.W.A.T. Truck, allowing them access to S.W.A.T. mode.

Sergeant Silverback's only companion is an older model S.P.D. canine robot reminiscent of R.I.C. It seems to be modeled after a bulldog. He speaks as a stereotypical military officer (reminiscent of military actor R. Lee Ermey).

In Endings, Part 2 he was among several reinforcements to help S.P.D. in their final battle against the Troobians. He also brought his R.I.C. with him, and another S.W.A.T. truck to assist in the battle.

Boom
Boom (portrayed by Kelson Henderson) is the lab assistant of Kat Manx, and is always willing to test out her latest inventions. Boom attended S.P.D. academy, but washed out due to not having the right stuff.  However, he was of interest to Cruger, who convinced Kat to let him serve as her assistant.

Boom never told his parents about washing out. He managed to convince them that he was the "Orange Ranger", which came back to haunt him when they came to visit. He was forced to don a mock-up costume and team up with the B-Squad, putting the true Rangers in trouble. He then returned to what he knew best, and finally told his parents about his real job: a lab assistant for Kat's inventions.

During the two-part finale Endings, Boom plays a somewhat vital role. By summoning R.I.C. in Part 1, Boom is able to free himself and Kat in time to shut down the Delta Command Megazord and stop its attack on the Rangers. In Part 2, Boom gives a rousing speech to the SPD cadets that gets them to fight the Troobian invasion when the Rangers are unavailable. Boom fights briefly in the battle, but retreats inside with Kat when reinforcements later arrive.

S.O.P.H.I.E.
Short for Series One Processor Hyper Intelligent Encryptor, S.O.P.H.I.E. (portrayed by Natacha Hutchison) is a computer programmer and cyborg. She enrolled at S.P.D. to use her skills for good, hiding her cyborg origins (as cyborgs are highly prejudiced against). When the S.P.D. Rangers discovered her secret, she was unfairly expelled from the academy and pursued by Valko. After escaping from him (with the help of Cruger who heard her cry for help and as the Shadow Ranger card-captured him), she returned to S.P.D. and helped activate the Delta Command Megazord. Realizing that she meant no harm and what an asset she could be to S.P.D., she was given a job as a programmer at the Theta Quadrant.

D-Squad
The lowest-ranking squad, this squad consists of cadets who trained for eventual promotion to active status as C-Squad and up. They are trained and advised by the B-Squad. The D-Squad consists of S.O.P.H.I.E., 3 Caucasian Males, and an Asian Female.

Piggy
Piggy (portrayed by Barnie Duncan) is a bird-faced informant who works for whoever pays him the best, or threatens him for it (including SPD, Emperor Gruumm, and/or Broodwing). He spends much of his life on Earth as a homeless bum, eating garbage and developing connections with the underworld. He has a form of friendship with Z who has multiple times been shown to trust Piggy more than anyone else does - trusting him to guard the proton accelerator in "Beginnings", taking Kat to get a quantum enhancer from him in "S.W.A.T." and appealing to his better nature (and thanking him) when Bridge was in danger in "Missing". Unknown to most, however, he was in contact with Emperor Gruumm, who he appeared to serve directly, and was personally responsible for handing Gruumm the technology he needed to reach Earth.

In "Shadow", Piggy wins the lottery and opened his own trailer cafe that brings in lowlife patrons from many different planets. While Piggy otherwise lives a very comfortable life, when the Rangers show up at his cafe, his customers flee, which irritates Piggy to no end; to his customers, S.P.D. are the monsters to fear. His frequent jesting comments towards Syd make some believe that he had a minor crush on her.

He quickly finds himself caught between aiding either S.P.D., Gruumm, or Broodwing multiple times, such as stealing S.W.A.T. technology for both villains, and several times giving advice & information to the Rangers, contacting Gruumm/Broodwing to tell him about the Rangers being on their way, and then contact Broodwing/Gruumm to tell them about the other's plot! Both Broodwing and Gruumm saw Piggy as being key to their plans because of this. In Endings, he ended up leading the B-Squad into a trap where they were captured by Emperor Gruumm, much to Z's shock. When Piggy asked if he did the right thing, a lightning bolt destroyed his cafe and, taking the hint, Piggy sneaked onto Gruumm's ship disguised as a Krybot and freed them returning to Earth with them on the SWAT Flyers. He participated in the final battle against the Troobians and, afterward, joined Jack and Ally in their business of giving clothes to the homeless. Also Jack gave him credit for what he did saying none of them would be there (in front of SPD after the battle was over) if it hadn't been for him.

He makes a cameo in the Power Rangers Mystic Force episode "Ranger Down", because his actor was available since he also played Toby. He reveals that he just came from another galaxy, establishing himself at least 19 years before anyone else arrived on Earth. When the cat genie Jenji stumbles upon the same alley Piggy is in, Piggy (after discouraging Jenji from a life of crime) predicts much of SPD that he explains that his dream is: "to win the lottery and open a restaurant... with wheels, called "Piggy's", and says "in 20 years this place will be crawling with aliens...".

Ally Samuels
Ally Samuels (played by Beth Allen) is the daughter of the Samuel Clothings owner. She first appears in "Resurrection" where Jack mistakes her for robbing a truck only to learn that she is unloading the truck's contents for Samuel Clothings (which helps out the city's less fortunate). Jack later apologizes to her for the misunderstanding and she was able to forgive him.

In "Endings," Jack resigned from S.P.D. and joined Piggy into helping Ally and the other workers of Samuel Clothings, because he wanted to be part of something bigger than himself, despite having been doing that already.

Troobian Empire
The Troobian Empire is a galactic empire and warlike army in the service of Emperor Gruumm. The term Troobian refers to any being that serves under Gruumm (as stated by Bruce Kalish).

Gruumm's forces travel in the Terror Spacecraft that they use to travel throughout outer space in its journey to conquer and destroy planets. Inside, everything is green, dank, and skeletal.

Information about them can be found below.

Omni
Omni (voiced by Geoff Dolan) is secretly the power behind the throne and de facto leader of the Troobians. He is a giant brain housed in a tank in a room on Gruumm's spacecraft. He has a single eye on a tentacle-like appendage. He was mentioned on a few occasions throughout in the season, but was finally revealed at the end of the episode Insomnia, making Mora pledge her allegiance to it. In Endings, Part 1, he not only "spoke" for the first time (berating Gruumm over his petty feud with Cruger), but his name was revealed.

Omni's reason for attacking Earth was to drain its resources for a weapon in development that he refers to as The Magnificence, a colossal biomechanical body for himself that Gruumm created with the stolen resources. Once the Terror Spacecraft locked in, Omni was connected to his body and used it to fight the S.W.A.T. Megazord, having the upper hand until Doggie Cruger opened an access panel from the inside, allowing the Megazord to deliver a maxed-out laser blast, causing the Magnificence to implode and taking Omni with it.

Omni possesses psychic powers and is able to both talk to & harm Gruumm from a distance, as well as brainwash people into serving him. In his Magnificence, he is large enough to hold the Megazord in his hand and wields incredible destructive power.

In an interview (9:26 in), Greg Aronowitz stated that "Gruumm has always been Omni's puppet... [Gruum] has power, but he has issues and he has weakness, and Omni has taken advantage of that for as long as time can remember." 

Emperor Gruumm
Emperor Gruumm (portrayed by Rene Naufahu  who would later  be cast as Mentor Ji in Power Rangers Samurai) is a figurehead who serves as the de jure leader of the Troobians  alien race whose ultimate goal is to conquer other worlds.  Gruumm is relentless and nothing will stand in his way to conquer the universe.  He previously destroyed the planet Sirius (home world of Commander Anubis "Doggie" Cruger), and in 2025 he launched an assault on Earth.

Gruumm's main strategy is to overwhelm and devastate a planet with constant, large-scale assaults and then drain the planet of its resources, as shown in the flashbacks to the Sirian invasion, and used such tactics on the Helix Nebula simply to draw the A-Squad into an ambush. His highly destructive tactics show life means little to him, and it was initially unclear why he wasn't using such tactics to conquer Earth except on rare occasions, and why he allowed Broodwing to battle the Rangers for him on several occasions. It is briefly shown that his ship can even destroy a planet from orbit. He also was shown repeatedly talking to either himself or an unseen entity whom he referred to as "the Magnificence". It became clear later on that Gruumm had been working off a long-term plan, intending not to leech and destroy Earth but instead to use its resources - which he looted over the course of the season - to construct a body for Omni, a higher power who he fears and worships.

Emperor Gruumm has two aides, Mora (later Morgana) and Broodwing. He has a bitter hatred for Cruger, who cut off his right horn in the battle for Sirius. He is also the most powerful warrior among the Troobian empire, as proved in his victories over the B-Squad Rangers and Supreme Commander Fowler Birdie.  His main weapon is a staff that shoots energy, and he also rides a motorcycle with laser cannons. Gruumm has the ability to use telepathy and shapeshift into a selected human form. In battle, he has shown the ability to decimate the Rangers, defeat Commander Birdie and also harm Zeltrax, though Cruger has shown the ability to defeat him.

As Omni's master plan came to fruition, Cruger escaped from a cell onboard Gruumm's ship and the two engaged in battle. Although Gruumm was thought to have perished along with the Magnificence, he survived and engaged Cruger (who was unmorphed) one last time, only to get his left horn cut off after being easily defeated. He was then contained.

He appears in the Nintendo DS version of Power Rangers: Super Legends as the main villain who has set his sights upon the myth of the Hall of Legends, the resting place of the collected energies of Power Rangers across time. In his twisted mind he envisioned a world where his enemy's power is not only stolen, but used to make him a living god over all creation.

Broodwing
Broodwing (voiced by Jim McLarty) is a three-eyed vampire bat-like alien who is encased in an artificial environment, as demonstrated by the jar on his head. He served as the weapons dealer for the Troobians. He is an emotionless criminal who cares about nothing except money. He supposedly works for Emperor Gruumm, but has been known to work for other aliens as well. He is often forced to play with Mora, much to his displeasure. Broodwing is the source of the rare Orangehead Krybots, as well as providing Gruumm with giant robots for his monsters and Blueheads. Broodwing also has control over a rare race of bats, whose bite can cause beings to grow huge. Shortly after the arrival of Omega Ranger, Gruumm began ordering Broodwing to provide his services while refusing to pay for them. This did not sit well with Broodwing, whose main motivation has always been money, so he began plotting against Gruumm and attempted to conquer Earth first in order to one-up him. For a while, Broodwing was actually behind more attacks on Earth than Gruumm was. One of his assaults involved bringing the Dino Rangers from the past, planning to force them to do his bidding so he could destroy the SPD Rangers.

When Cruger was kidnapped, Broodwing took advantage of this and invaded the Delta Base with the intent of using the Delta Command Megazord to destroy Newtech City, but he was arrested and contained by the Canine Cannon when the plan backfired.

Broodwing would return in Power Rangers Cosmic Fury, teaming up with Lord Zedd in 2023, two years before the S.P.D. series.

It's possible that Broodwing is responsible for freeing Zedd to give him a test to conquer Earth and the Universe before Gruumm and the Troobian Empire arrive.

Mora / Morgana
Morgana is a servant of Emperor Gruumm. Gruumm found Morgana and turned her into Mora. She initially appeared as Mora, a 10-year-old girl who is pure evil and is a gifted pictomancer, being able to create real monsters from her drawings. Mora enjoyed playing with dolls. She has multiple contacts in the criminal underworld such as General Valko and Shorty.

As Mora, she was very spoiled and got on Gruumm's nerves. She took advantage of a young, lonely boy named Sam by promising to be his friend if he would use his power of teleportation to help her monster, Bugglesworth. Sam finally realized the evil acts that Bugglesworth was committing and helped Z Delgado foil Mora's plan to turn people into dolls.

After the defeat of her ally, General Valko, Gruumm punished Mora by reverting her to her adult form, Morgana. She was known for both her beauty and strength but she thought she looked hideous as an adult (a sentiment Piggy also shares with the belief she looked better as Mora). Morgana became desperate to be given back her youth, and set about trying to impress Gruumm and make him turn her back into Mora. Some later she reveals she has a battle suit and dons it when she fights along with the villains. Morgana was armed with energy projection, martial art techniques, and she occasionally controlled giant robots. Despite being an adult, Morgana still acted like a child, albeit an extremely sadistic and powerful one; her first battle was a grudge match against Z for shooting her doll, where she beat Z into submission and then walked away to rub it in.

When Morgana was successful in retrieving the Hymotech Synthetic Plasma from Newtech Laboratory, Gruumm granted her wish and turned her back into Mora. However, Omni soon forced Mora to pledge her allegiance to him under his mind control. As a result of this, Mora's personality underwent a dramatic change; she even discarded her beloved doll into the abyss inside the ship, and started wearing a more militaristic outfit instead of her dress, and wore her hair up.

Near the end of the series, Cruger confronted Mora on Gruumm's ship. She threw as many monsters as she could (given the amount of paper in her sketchpad) at him, but he destroyed them all and confined her.

Morgana would return in Power Rangers Cosmic Fury, in 2023, two years before the S.P.D. series, Olivia James-Baird wound reprise as Morgana.

Mora is played by James-Baird and Morgana is played by Josephine Davison.

A-Squad
The A-Squad was the Space Patrol Delta Academy's elite Ranger team, the defenders of Earth.

The members of A-Squad are:

 Charlie/A-Squad Red  Charlie was the only one of the five characters to be named, in the credits at the end. She is a Hispanic human female. She is portrayed by Gina Varela.
 A-Squad Blue  An alien male of an Walrus race. He is voiced by Nick Kemplen.
 A-Squad Green  An African-American human male. He is voiced by D.J. Sena.
 A-Squad Yellow  A blond Caucasian human male. He is voiced by Greg Cooper II.
 A-Squad Pink  An Asian human female. She is portrayed by Motoko Nagino and voiced by Claire Dougan.

During their early appearances in the series, they only appear morphed and are sent out to face the newest threat to the planet's safety. However, the A-Squad were already corrupt. Bridge sensed "something off" with their aura in the first episode, but didn't have the chance to find out what. In the episode "Confronted", the A-Squad is sent to the Helix Nebula to defend it from Emperor Gruumm. This was a trap and contact is lost with them in "Walls" after it was made clear they were being overwhelmed. They were considered "missing in action". In this episode, A-Squad Red's voice was distorted in editing to sound male instead of female.

Unknown to the Rangers, the A-Squad had survived and had defected to Gruumm's side, wanting to be on "the winning team" (as stated in "Endings"). They bide their time, destroying the SPD Gamma 4 base (confirmed at conventions and in interviews by the show's producers), before finally faking a crash-land on Gamma-Orion and sending an SOS to have the B-Squad 'find' them alive.  The B-Squad Rangers soon became frustrated when Cruger abruptly dismissed them to debrief the A-Squad.

However, at the end of "Resurrection", the A-Squad revealed their true allegiance and kidnapped Commander Cruger. Following this treachery, the B-Squad battled with the A-Squad. Despite the A-Squad initially having the upper hand, B-Squad managed to overcome them with a combination of smarter battle tactics and S.W.A.T. Mode. Escalating the battle, the A-Squad upped the ante by unleashing their own Megazord, which transforms from Broodwing's drill vehicle. A battle ensued, but when the Delta Command Base was overtaken by Broodwing's forces and transformed into the Delta Command Megazord to destroy the city, the Omegamax Megazord was disabled and the Delta Squad Megazord was destroyed. After the B-Squad had recovered, they recovered the S.W.A.T. flyers from the secret underground zord bay – which only Bridge had known about – and used the S.W.A.T. Megazord to destroy the A-Squad's Megazord, finally defeating them.

The A-Squad was found guilty of treason and contained by the B-Squad with their Delta Morphers without a further fight. Commander Cruger promoted B-squad rangers to the A-squad status but at the request of B-Squad (who felt that they were B-Squad rather than A-Squad) the A-Squad "ranking" was retired and the B-squad was made the highest ranked team in SPD.

In the pages of Jetix Magazine, the A-Squad makes an appearance in the S.P.D. comic strip in the two part "finale" of the strip called "Invasion". Here, they are brainwashed by Gruumm as opposed to corrupted, which is consistent with the original outline for their storyline,  and turn on the S.P.D. defense armada orbiting Earth. They are disposed of by B-Squad after a brief battle in the following issue and are not seen again. Their ranking is given to B-Squad for defeating Gruumm and Omni.

Krybots
The Krybots are the Troobian Empire's foot soldiers which come in many varieties. The Krybots come in three different varieties, each one stronger than the previous. The most commonly used and weakest version are ones that have round, gray-colored heads.

Bluehead Krybots
Bluehead Krybots are stronger versions of the normal Krybots. Like their names suggest, they have blue, x-shaped heads and have blue breastplates. They wield laser blasters and sometimes swords. They are summoned from spherical devices that resemble their heads.

The Bluehead Krybots are voiced by Derek Judge.

Orangehead Krybots
Orangehead Krybots are the strongest version of the Krybots. Like their name implies, they have spikey, orange heads and orange and black bodies. They wield swords in battle and can summon powerful attacks like the Triforce Shockwave to attack with. They are summoned from orange, spikey spherical devices that resemble their heads.

The Orangehead Krybots are voiced by James Gaylyn.

Criminals
These are the criminals hired by the Troobian Empire. Some of them are drawn up by Mora. These criminals are adapted from the criminals that appeared in Tokusou Sentai Dekaranger. While a few of them have grown, most of them pilot giant robots.

 Praxis (voiced by Bruce Hopkins) - Praxis appears as a walking blue diamond/bee-themed alien with red wings and a large red star on his forehead. Praxis was drawn up by Mora and sent inside the Giant Drill Robot to destroy the city.
 Ringbah (voiced by Bruce Hopkins) - An alien bounty hunter hired by Gruumm to destroy the Rangers. Ringbah appears as a short alien wrapped in gray wires. Emperor Gruumm sent him to attack the city with his robot.
 Rhinix (voiced by Mark Wright) - A rhinoceros-themed alien who bought a formula from Piggy that can turn humans into a green slimy fuel.
 T-Top (voiced by Mark Wright) - An alien bounty hunter who was pursuing Hydrax. According to Z, his dossier possibly called him Trilondon or Trilondonian. Z coined the nickname T-Top after giving up on pronouncing his true name properly. Broodwing used his bats to cause T-Top to go berserk until the Rangers restored him to size. Following Hydrax's defeat, it was mentioned by the Rangers that T-Top will not be allowed to return for the damages that he caused.
 Hydrax (voiced by Sarah Thomson) - A Fernovian bank robber who got help from Broodwing to frame T-Top. A Fernovian is a plant-based alien who can jettison water at an extremely high level.
 Bugglesworth (voiced by Kelson Henderson) - A Cthulhu-themed monster drawn up by Mora that looks like a big fat pink baby with a cloak with tentacles for hair. He can turn people into dolls.
 Giganis (voiced by Dwayne Cameron who also portrayed his human form) - Dru Harrington was an SPD cadet from the planet Tangar. He and Sky were best friends until Dru was sent to the Nebula Academy where he shortly became missing in action. His marksmanship is nearly unmatched. He turned out to be working for Broodwing in his alien form of Giganis and attempted to assassinate Commander Cruger. When Giganis was defeated and regressed back to Dru, Sky placed him under arrest.
 Sinuku (voiced by James Coleman) - An evil snake-themed scientist who originally used his brilliant mind to develop weapons. He escapes from K0-35's satellite prison when Broodwing broke him out.
 "Debugger" - A balance-themed monster brought to life by Mora. He held a bus full of people hostage.
 General Benaag (voiced by James Gaylyn) - General Benaag led the attack on Sirius and was second-in-command to Emperor Gruumm on Sirius. During the battle, Commander Cruger's wife Isinia was abducted by Benaag, leaving a personal war between Benaag and Cruger. When he was finally arrested by Cruger, Benaag was revealed to be innocent of Isinia's murder, foreshadowing the later revelation that Isinia was in fact alive.
 Drakel (voiced by Mike Havoc) - A Vampiranoid hired by Gruumm to steal a stone called The Evil. A Vampiranoid is a werewolf/vampire bat alien that is nocturnal and cannot handle being in the sun.
 General Valko (voiced by Jason Hoyte) - Valko is a ruthless General from the Perterian Army whom Mora recruited as Gruumm's new second-in-command ever since Cruger contained General Benaag.
 General Tomars (voiced by Campbell Cooley) - Tomars is a criminal who had a device that could transport a person to any location in this or sixteen other dimensions. His fate is unknown if he survive or not.
 Wootox (voiced by Jeremy Birchall) - Wootox is an infamous alien criminal responsible for the destruction of over ninety planets and often flips a coin to make decisions. He is one of few aliens in the Power Rangers universe to not speak English as his speech being translated by a neck-worn device. Wootox also had the ability to switch minds with anyone.
 Katana (voiced by Mark Wright) - An alien who crash-landed on Earth and was rescued and later trained by a samurai long ago. He was brought to the present by Broodwing to serve him. Jack later returned him to his time.
 "Invador" - A green-headed criminal who came to Earth to cause trouble.
 Changtor (voiced by Darren Young) - Syd and Z fought this monster alone as per Fowler Birdy's command.
 Green Eyes (voiced by Matthew Sutherland) - He was sent by Gruumm to steal gold. He took a friendly Indian-like alien security guard hostage in the process.
 Shorty (voiced by Ray Trickett) - Shorty is a goblin-like alian the galaxy's second most wanted criminal and the younger brother of Devastation. Shorty is a powerful fighter with metallic fists and rubbery skin that is unaffected by most blows. In an alternate timeline, the appearance of Shorty and Devastation caused Earth to be conquered by the Troobians. Shorty was defeated by the Omega Ranger with the Omegamax Megazord. Unlike most SPD villains, Shorty was destroyed and not arrested. He is voiced by Ray Trickett.
 Devastation (voiced by Kelson Henderson) - Devastation is the galaxy's most wanted criminal and one of the most powerful foes the Rangers ever faced. He arrived on Earth in response to a signal sent by his younger brother Shorty and Morgana. In an alternate timeline, his appearance on Earth allowed the Troobians to conquer Earth. After a grueling battle, unlike his brother Devastation never able to grow, his robot was destroyed by the Delta Squad Megazord riding the Omegamax Cycle and Devastation was seemingly destroyed. His defeat altered the timeline for the better.
 Mysticon (voiced by Barnie Duncan) - Mysticon is a failing street magician. With Mysticon down on his luck, Morgana took the opportunity to offer him and Al fame and fortune by giving them a magic wand. Reluctant but desperate, Mysticon took the offer. In return, they had to carry out some favors for Morgana. He is voiced by Barnie Duncan.
 Al (voiced by Barnie Duncan) - Mysticon's lizard-like assistant. He assisted Mysticon when they were ordered by Morgana to commit crimes in New Tech.
 Slate (voiced by Jeremy Birchall) - Slate (short for Blank Slate) is a faceless copycat criminal with the ability to duplicate the appearance and powers of anyone as long as he has their DNA samples. Hired by Broodwing (supposedly for Grumm), he was supplied with the DNA samples of Rhinix, Hydrax, Bugglesworth, Tomars, Sinuku, and Devastation. Defeated by the SPD Battilizer and arrested.
 Mirloc (voiced by Mike Drew) - Murloc is a mirror-themed criminal with the ability to travel through reflective surfaces. He was responsible for the murder of Sky's father. The character was inspired by Hannibal Lecter sharing many of his same traits and personality. Following the defeat of Slate, Mirloc used Sky's tears to escape from his imprisonment. Defeated and arrested by Sky using the Red Ranger powers and the SPD Battilizer after he managed to escape through Sky's tears. Mirloc was sent to a prison on Verinox 12 where there isn't any sunlight there to create reflections for him to travel through.
 Stench and Thresher (voiced by Greg Johnson and Paul Barrett) - Two aliens who hacked into S.P.D.'s computers and stole the SWAT technology.
 El Scorpio - A simulated monster which the Rangers fought while training on Zentor.
 Gineka, Delapoo, and Chiaggo (voiced by Shane Bosher, Glen Drake, and Stephen Brunton) - Rich and narcissistic criminals backed by Broodwing. These three were responsible for the attack on the Alpha 5 star system. Bridge recognized their giant robots from the reoccurring prophetic dreams that he has been having. They were defeated by the new S.W.A.T. Megazord and contained.
 "Blobgoblin" - A gas-like monster drawn up by Morgana to give Gruumm a monster that he never saw before. Defeated by the S.P.D. Rangers.
 One Eye (voiced by Jarrod Holt) - A cycloptic purple giant alien drawn up by Morgana.
 Silverhead (voiced by Michael Hurst) - A silver-headed jackal-themed Krybot-like alien drawn up by Morgana. He is voiced by Michael Hurst.
 Professor Mooney (voiced by Cameron Rhodes) - Professor Mooney is Kat's old friend in school. He sided with Broodwing to destroy the city with remote-control giant robots.
 Bork (voiced by Blair Strang) - An alien criminal and self-proclaimed "ultimate master" who trapped Bridge in a shrinking room. Wanted in ten galaxies for crimes including leaving Alpha Centauri in ruins.
 Herock (voiced by Geoff Dolan) - Herock is a white tiger-like crime lord who came to settle a score with Bork, but was vaporized by him.
 Dragoul (voiced by Patrick Wilson) - A ground-burrowing monster used by Broodwing. He was highly resistant to the Rangers' weapons. He was destroyed by the Delta Max Megazord.
 Dragoul II (voiced by Patrick Wilson) - Summoned by Broodwing after the defeat of the first Dragoul, the second Dragoul was even stronger and able to grow much larger than the standard giant-monster size.
 Kraw (voiced by Stig Eldred) - An alien criminal who took the form of the astronomer Professor Cerebros. He is voiced by Stig Eldred.
 Icthior (voiced by Jason Hoyte in the TV series, Wally Wingert in Power Rangers: Super Legends) - A fish-like rival of Cruger's from the SPD academy, Icthior is a dirty fighter armed with the powerful Ocean Saber. Originally, he fought Cruger for Isinia's hand, but Isinia preferred Anubis. Icthior was expelled for fighting dirty, and swore vengeance on Cruger. Pledging his services to Broodwing, Icthior set out to have vengeance on Cruger by defeating Cruger's Rangers.
 Spotty-Eyed Monster (voiced by Peter Feeney) - A large-chested female criminal with a deep, manly voice drawn by Mora to assist Zeltrax in the past.
 Green Monster (voiced by Alistair Browning) - A green criminal drawn by Mora to assist Zeltrax in the past.
 Vine Monster (voiced by Robert Pollock) - A vine-themed criminal drawn by Mora to assist Zeltrax in the past.
 Delex (voiced by Andrew Laing) - A monster that could turn people into batteries that would later be used for Broodwing's takeover of earth.
 Unnamed Alien (voiced by Tom Kane) - Alongside of some Krybots, this alien was guarding an area on Gamma Orion where the A-Squad was held and was arrested by B-Squad. In "Endings" Pt. 2, a character from the same species as him made a cameo as an S.P.D. cadet.
 Crabhead (voiced by Robert Mignault) - A crab-themed alien who accompanied Broodwing in his invasion on SPD HQ.
 Spiketor (voiced by Edwin Wright) - A sea urchin-themed alien who accompanied Broodwing in his invasion on SPD HQ. He wields a sword that is similar to the swords wielded by the Orangehead Krybots.
 Lazor (voiced by Michaela Rooney) - A mantis shrimp-themed alien who accompanied Broodwing in his invasion on SPD HQ. She wields a rifle that is similar to the rifle that was wielded by Silverhead.
 Cricket Monster - To prevent Cruger from getting to Gruumm, Mora drew this monster to slow Cruger down. The Cricket Monster was an alien that resembled a cricket. It was defeated in one hit.
 Jackal Monster - To prevent Cruger from getting to Gruumm, Mora drew this monsters to slow Cruger down. The Jackal Monster looked like a purple and white furry jackal. It was defeated in one hit.
 Demon Monster - To prevent Cruger from getting to Gruumm, Mora drew this monsters to slow Cruger down. The Demon Monster looked like a bodybuilding, orange demon with horns. It was defeated in one hit.
 Heater Monster - To prevent Cruger from getting to Gruumm, Mora drew this monsters to slow Cruger down. The Heater Monster looked like a spike-covered heater-themed robot. It was defeated in one hit.
 Jail Bird Monster - To prevent Cruger from getting to Gruumm, Mora drew this monsters to slow Cruger down. The Jail Bird Monster looked like a bird that was dressed in prison-striped garb. It was defeated in one hit.
 Tentacle Monster - To prevent Cruger from getting to Gruumm, Mora drew this monsters to slow Cruger down. The Tentacle Monster looked like a blue-headed jellyfish-themed alien with four hand-tipped tentacles and one eye which can float. It was defeated in one hit.

Giant Robots
Throughout the series, alien criminals, Krybots, and members of the Troobian Empire would sometimes use giant robots to battle the Megazords as most of the other alien criminals did not possess the ability to grow to giant size. Many of these giant robots were sold to Gruumm and his minions by Broodwing. Many of the robots were upgraded and recolored versions of past versions.

 Model #1 (a.k.a. Conenose Robot') - A series of lobster/fiddler crab-themed robots. The first model of Giant Robot with a triangle-shaped body and blades for arms, the first one was used against the A-Squad when they piloted the Delta Squad Megazord. A second version of this robot was piloted by Ringbah with differently styled blades and colors, this one was destroyed by the Red, Green, Yellow and Pink Delta Runners. A third one was made, this one colored orange and had a pair of scissor-like blades for a right arm, and was piloted by a Bluehead Krybot in "Abandoned" and was destroyed by the Delta Squad Megazord. A fourth one, almost identical to the last, was used by Silverhead in "Robotpalooza" and was destroyed by the Deltamax Megazord. A black, white and silver version of this robot was remote-controlled by Professor Mooney in "Katastrophe" but was destroyed by the Delta Squad and Omegamax Megazords.
 Model #2 (a.k.a. Mega Drill) - A second giant robot used was a tank-like vehicle composed of a giant drill-tipped turbine and had spikes. It was piloted by Praxis, but was destroyed by the Delta Squad Megazord.
 Model #3 (a.k.a. Dish Robot) - The third giant robot was yellow and orange colored and had a satellite dish on its head. The first version was piloted by the childlike Bugglesworth. It was destroyed by the Delta Squad Megazord. A second version of this robot later turned up in "Robotpalooza" piloted by Chiaggo, but was destroyed by the S.W.A.T. Megazord.
 Model #4 (a.k.a. Ninja Robot) - The fourth giant robot had large bat-like wings and fought like a ninja, this first version was piloted by Sinuku, who used De-magnetrons to amplify its firepower, but in the end it was defeated when the Delta Squad Megazord deflected its energy back at it. A second version of this robot was piloted by Wootox in "Recognition," but was destroyed by the Delta Command Megazord.
 Model #5 (a.k.a. Drill Robot) - The fifth giant robot had drills for fingers and for its nose, the first version was piloted by a Bluehead Krybot but was destroyed by the Delta Squad Megazord. The second version of this model was piloted by Green Eyes in "Perspective." It was destroyed by the Delta Squad Megazord.
 Model #6 (a.k.a. Gladiator Robot) - The sixth giant was a gladiator-stylized robot that wielded a round shield and spear. The first version was piloted by a Bluehead Krybot but was defeated by the Delta Squad Megazord and then devoured by Goradon. The second version of this robot was piloted by Invador in "Dismissed," but it too was destroyed by the Delta Squad Megazord.
 Goradon - Goradon was a massive, cybernetic lifeform composed of a spherical body with an enormous mouth and tentacles that possessed incredible destructive powers. General Valko vied to control Goradon so that he may present the cyborg beast to Gruumm and prove his worthiness in the Troobian Empire. To gain control, Valko needed a cyborg girl named S.O.P.H.I.E. (who was a "Series One Processor Hyper Intelligent Encryptor"). After the Rangers fought and defeated a giant robot piloted by a Bluehead, Goradon devoured the fallen robot. Valko was able to gain some control over Goradon after kidnapping SOPHIE and using her to control it, but the Rangers were able to rescue SOPHIE, defeat Valko and destroyed Goradon with the Delta Command Megazord.
 Model #7 (a.k.a. Robot God Marato) - The seventh giant robot was called Marato, it was a strange-looking very large chest of drawers-themed robot where its drawers could hold objects the size of buildings. Broodwing used this robot to steal and contain temples and buildings in Kyoto, Japan. Kruger was forced to pilot Delta Command to Kyoto, there the Delta Command Megazord was able to free the temples captured by Marato and destroyed the robot. A second version of Marato was piloted by Broodwing in "Badge" to attack the Delta Base, but was destroyed by the Delta Command Megazord.
 Model #8 (a.k.a. 'Robot of Destruction) - The eighth giant robot was known as the Robot of Destruction. It was pink in color, had a face on its torso and resembled a demon with horns. It was piloted by Devastation. This robot was incredibly powerful, able to beat back the Rangers' current arsenal. It wasn't until Sam arrived were the tables turned and this robot destroyed by the Delta Squad Megazord riding the Omegamax Cycle. A second version of this robot appeared in "Reflections" Pt. 1 piloted by Slate, but it was destroyed by the Delta Squad Megazord.
 Model #9 (a.k.a. Horned Robot) - The ninth giant robot had horns an oblong body, bat-like ears and scissor-shaped claws. The first one was piloted by Mysticon and destroyed by the Deltamax Megazord. In "Robotpalooza," Delapoo piloted this robot the next time it was seen and was destroyed by the S.W.A.T. Megazord. Later on in "Missing," Bork piloted a gold-colored version of this robot. It was destroyed by the S.W.A.T. Megazord.
 Model #10 (a.k.a. Angel Robot) - The tenth giant robot resembled a gold and silver angel wielding a spear. Only one of these robots was used where it was piloted by a Bluehead Krybot in "Reflection Part 2", but was destroyed by the Omegamax Megazord piloted by Jack.
 Model #11 (a.k.a. Cyclops Robot) - The eleventh giant robot had a black and bulky body and a triangle-shaped head with a blue eye. The first version of this robot was piloted by Thresher, but was destroyed by the Deltamax Megazord. The second appeared in "Robotpalooza" driven by Blobgoblin, but was destroyed by the Delta Squad and Omegamax Megazords.
 Model #12 (a.k.a. Jet Robot) - The twelfth giant robot used was a blue and silver cycloptic robot piloted by Gineka. It can transform into a stealth aircraft. This giant robot was destroyed by the S.W.A.T. Megazord.
 Gigabot - Gigabot was an enormous dinosaur-like robot that was built by Professor Mooney and Broodwing using components of past giant robots. The Gigabot has the arms of the Drill Robot #1, the shoulders of the Jet Robot, the remains of the Mega Drill for its chest, the jet boosters of the Robot of Destruction, the legs of the Ninja Robot, and the tail of the Conenose Robot #2. It was one of the most powerful giant robots but was destroyed by the S.W.A.T. Megazord.
 Model #13 (a.k.a. A-Squad Megazord') - The thirteenth and final giant robot used in the series was piloted by both Broodwing and the A-Squad. In its initial form, it took the form of a giant drill that Broodwing used to burrow into Delta Command HQ. This robot was later hijacked by the A-Squad and transformed into an orange and silver humanoid form that resembled Broodwing himself. The A-Squad used it to battle the smaller Megazords while Broodwing used the captured Delta Command Megazord to destroy Newtech City. This robot destroyed the Delta Squad Megazord, but the Rangers were able to destroy the robot with the S.W.A.T. Megazord and arrested and contained the A-Squad.

Notes

References

External links
 Official Power Rangers Website
 

S.P.D.
Characters
Television characters introduced in 2005